Kevin Hand is an astrobiologist and planetary scientist at JPL.
He is also the founder of Cosmos Education and was its president until 2007.
He was working at NASA Ames when he was inspired to form Cosmos Education in 1999 after getting a grant from the Earth and Space Foundation to tour African schools to talk about how education relates to space research.

Education and career

Hand studied psychology and physics as an undergraduate at Dartmouth.
He earned a master's degree at Stanford University in mechanical engineering while also working as a public policy research associate at Stanford's Center for International Security and Cooperation (CISAC).
He chose the question of whether Europa's putative ocean could harbor life as his Geological & Environmental Sciences PhD dissertation topic, under the direction of Christopher Chyba,
earning the doctorate in 2007.

While a PhD student, he was chosen by James Cameron to take marine biology samples from hydrothermal vents in subsea expeditions to the mid-Atlantic ridge and East Pacific Rise. He was a featured scientist in Cameron's 2005 IMAX documentary, Aliens of the Deep.

At a 2014 NASA panel discussion, Hand predicted that  extraterrestrial life would be found within 20 years.

Hand published the book Alien Oceans in 2020.

Selected publications 

 
 , a review of

Bibliography

 Alien Oceans (2020)

References

External links 

 
  
 Video of Kevin Hand's April 2019 non-technical talk on "Ocean Worlds of the Outer Solar System" as part of the Silicon Valley Astronomy Lectures

Year of birth missing (living people)
Living people
Planetary scientists
Dartmouth College alumni
Stanford University alumni
Astrobiologists
Jet Propulsion Laboratory faculty
20th-century American scientists
21st-century American scientists